Nebek may refer to:

 Paliurus spina-christi, a species of tree
 Al-Nabek, a city in Syria